The Disappearance of Madeleine McCann is an American Netflix documentary series directed by Chris Smith. It premiered on Netflix on March 15, 2019, starring Anthony Summers, Gonçalo Amaral and Robbyn Swan, exploring the disappearance of three-year-old Madeleine McCann, who vanished from the seaside resort of Praia da Luz in Portugal, while on holiday with her family.

Premise
The Disappearance of Madeleine McCann depicts the disappearance of three-year-old Madeleine McCann, who vanished from an Algarve holiday apartment at the seaside resort of Praia da Luz in Portugal, in May 2007 as her parents enjoyed a meal with friends 100 yards away. It explores the media, the investigation and the McCanns, although the McCanns themselves do not take part in this docu-series.

Cast
 Anthony Summers
 Gonçalo Amaral
 Robbyn Swan
 Jim Gamble
 Jon Clarke
 Sandra Felgueiras
 Ernie Allen
 Robert Murat
 Susan Hubbard 
 Haynes Hubbard
 Kelvin Mackenzie
 Paulo Pereira Cristovao
 Brian Kennedy
 Patrick Kennedy
 Jayne Jensen
 Neil Berry
 Julian Peribañez
 Rui Gustavo
 Justine McGuinness
 Patricia de Sousa Cipriano
 Phil Hall
 Martin Grime
 Jane Tanner

References

External links
 
 
 

2019 American television series debuts
2019 American television series endings
2010s American documentary television series
Netflix original documentary television series
English-language Netflix original programming